The Cessna 185 Skywagon is a six-seat, single-engined, general aviation light aircraft manufactured by Cessna.  It first flew as a prototype in July 1960, with the first production model completed in March 1961.  The Cessna 185 is a high-winged aircraft with non-retractable conventional landing gear and a tailwheel.

Over 4,400 were built with production ceasing in 1985. When Cessna re-introduced some of its most popular models in the 1990s, the tailwheel equipped Cessna 180 and 185 were not put back into production.

Design and development
The aircraft is basically a Cessna 180 with a strengthened fuselage.  The main difference between the two aircraft is the larger vertical fin on the 185 and the 300 hp (224 kW) Continental IO-520-D engine as opposed to the 230 hp (172 kW) Continental O-470-S fitted to the Cessna 180.  The exception was that a Continental Motors IO-470-F engine of 260 hp (194 kW) was initially fitted until midway through the 1966 production year.  The later model Skywagon II has a factory fitted avionics package.

The Skywagon can also be fitted with floats, amphibious float, or skis.  The AgCarryall variant of the 185 adds a 151-gallon belly chemical tank and removable spray booms for aerial application.  It is also possible to fit a cargo pod under the fuselage that can carry an extra 300 lb (136 kg).

Operational history
The 180 and 185 are widely used in bush flying, the commercial transport of passengers and freight to rudimentary, remote airstrips, lakes and snowfields, primarily in Canada and Alaska.

Variants

Civil variants
185 Skywagon
Six seat high wing light aircraft powered by a  Continental IO-470-F, landplane gross weight  and first certified on 31 January 1961.
185A Skywagon
Six seat high wing light aircraft powered by a  Continental IO-470-F, landplane gross weight  and first certified on 20 September 1961.
185B Skywagon
Six seat high wing light aircraft powered by a  Continental IO-470-F, landplane gross weight  and first certified on 25 June 1962.
185C Skywagon
Six seat high wing light aircraft powered by a  Continental IO-470-F, landplane gross weight  and first certified on 19 July 1963.
185D Skywagon
Six seat high wing light aircraft powered by a  Continental IO-470-F, landplane gross weight  and first certified on 17 June 1964.

Six seat high wing light aircraft powered by a  Continental IO-470-F, landplane gross weight  and first certified on 24 September 1965.

Six seat high wing light aircraft and agricultural aircraft powered by a  Continental IO-520-D, landplane gross weight  and first certified on 24 September 1965.

Six seat high wing light aircraft and agricultural aircraft powered by a  Continental IO-520-D, landplane gross weight  and first certified on 16 October 1973.

Military variants
U-17A Military version of the Cessna 185E, powered by a 260-hp (194-kW) Continental IO-470-F piston engine. Supplied by the USAF to a number of countries under the Military Assistance Programme.
U-17B Military version of the Cessna A185E, powered by a 300-hp (224-kW) Continental IO-520-D piston engine. Supplied by the USAF to a number countries under the Military Assistance Programme.
U-17C Four-seat light utility aircraft, powered by a Continental IO-470-L piston engine.

Operators

Civil operators
The Cessna 185 is popular with air charter companies and is operated by private individuals and companies.

Military operators

As part of the United States Military Assistance Program, Cessna received a contract to supply the United States Air Force with the Skywagon. These were intended for delivery overseas and were designated U-17A and U-17B.

Argentine Army Aviation

Bolivian Air Force 7 x A185E, 8 x A185F * 5 x U-17A

Guardia Civil 3 x U-17A

Ecuadorian Army 2 x 185D

Hellenic Army 9+ x U-17A

Honduran Air Force received a Cessna 185B in 1962, a U-17A in 1963 and a 185D in 1965.

Indonesian Air Force

Islamic Republic of Iran Air Force 185A – no longer in service
Islamic Revolutionary Army Aviation 185A – no longer in service

Israel Air Force 185 

Jamaica Defence Force – 4 x 185 from 1963 to 1985
 Laos
 Royal Lao Air Force – U-17s used as reconnaissance and observation aircraft for Nokateng Forward Air Controllers during the Laotian Civil War

Nicaraguan Air Force 3 x U-17B

Panamanian Public Forces 3 x U-17A

Paraguayan Air Force 5 x U-17A

Peruvian Air Force 9 x 185

Philippine Air Force 8 x U-17A, 9 x U-17B

Portuguese Air Force 5 x 185A operated 1968 to 1974.

Rhodesian Air Force – Two civil aircraft impressed into service, about 17 aircraft on loan from the South African Air Force, in service during the 1970s.

Air Force of El Salvador 1 x 185

South African Air Force 24 x 185A, 12 x 185D, 9 x 185E

Republic of Vietnam Air Force – About 100 U-17As and U-17Bs were used by the VNAF. No longer in service.

Royal Thai Army Aviation U-17B
 Royal Thai Navy

Turkish Army Aviation U-17B

Uruguayan Air Force 12 x U-17A

Accidents and Incidents
 On August 14, 1989, a Cessna A185E Skywagon registered N95KW crashed shortly after a balked landing at Coastal Airport, located near Myrtle Grove, Florida. The pilot's seat latch slipped on the railing, causing the pilot to unintentionally stall the aircraft. The pilot and the two passengers on board were all severely injured. The resulting product liability trial, concluding twelve years later, resulted in a $480 million judgment against Cessna. The case was later settled out-of-court for an undisclosed sum. This accident also brought about a series of airworthiness directives that affected all small Cessnas ever built.

Specifications (1978 Cessna 185 II landplane)

Specification for differing configurations

See also

Notes

References
 Andrade, John. Militair 1982, Aviation Press Limited, London 1982. .
 Churchill, Jan. Hit My Smoke: Forward Air Controllers in Southeast Asia, Sunflower University Press, Manhattan KS, 1997. 
 Hagedorn, Daniel P. "From Caudillos to COIN". Air Enthusiast, Thirty-three, July–November 1986. pp. 55–70.

External links

185
High-wing aircraft
Single-engined tractor aircraft
1960s United States civil utility aircraft
Aircraft first flown in 1960
Glider tugs